Miłonów  is a village in the administrative district of Gmina Oława, within Oława County, Lower Silesian Voivodeship, in south-western Poland. Prior to 1945, it was part of Germany.

The village has a population of 50.

References

Villages in Oława County